North Okanagan—Shuswap is a federal electoral district in the province of British Columbia, Canada, that has been represented in the House of Commons of Canada since 1988. The district has been sporadically known as Okanagan—Shuswap.

Geography

North Okanagan–Shuswap consists of Subdivision C of Columbia-Shuswap Regional District, and the North Okanagan Regional District. This electoral district includes the towns of Salmon Arm, Vernon, Coldstream, Lumby and Armstrong.

Demographics

According to the Canada 2016 Census; 2013 representation

Languages: 90.7% English, 2.7% German, 1.5% French
Religions (2011): 52.3% Christian (11.9% Catholic, 8.3% United Church, 6.0% Anglican, 3.0% Baptist, 2.9% Lutheran, 1.6% Pentecostal, 1.1% Presbyterian, 17.5% Other), 45.3% No religion 
Median income (2015): $30,855 
Average income (2015): $41,500

History
This district was created in 1987 from Kamloops—Shuswap and Okanagan North ridings.

In 1996, the riding was abolished and replaced by "North Okanagan–Shuswap". In 1997, the name of this riding was changed to "Okanagan—Shuswap". There were no elections during this time. The riding was abolished again in 2003, and was again replaced by a riding called "North Okanagan—Shuswap". In 2004, the name was changed back to "Okanagan—Shuswap".

The 2012 federal electoral boundaries redistribution concluded that the boundaries of Okanagan—Shuswap should be adjusted, and a slightly modified electoral district will be contested in future elections under the name "North Okanagan—Shuswap". The redefined North Okanagan—Shuswap gains an area previously in the district of Kootenay—Columbia comprising the small community of Needles and its environs. These new boundaries were legally defined in the 2013 representation order, and came into effect upon the call of the 42nd Canadian federal election, scheduled for October 2015.

Members of Parliament

This riding has elected the following Members of Parliament:

Current Member of Parliament

Its Member of Parliament is Mel Arnold of the Conservative Party of Canada.

Election results

North Okanagan—Shuswap, 2015–present

Okanagan—Shuswap, 2006–2015

North Okanagan—Shuswap, 2004–2006

Okanagan—Shuswap, 1988–2004

See also
 List of Canadian federal electoral districts
 Past Canadian electoral districts

References

 Library of Parliament Riding Profile (1987–1996)
 Library of Parliament Riding Profile (1996–1997)
 Library of Parliament Riding Profile (1997–2003)
 Library of Parliament Riding Profile (2003–2004)
 Library of Parliament Riding Profile (2004–present)
 Expenditures - 2004
 Expenditures – 2000
 Expenditures 1997

Notes

External links
Salmon Arm's Home Page 
Local NDP riding association contact info 
 Website of the Parliament of Canada

British Columbia federal electoral districts
Salmon Arm
Vernon, British Columbia
Constituencies established in 2003
2003 establishments in British Columbia